On 1 July 1960, a United States RB-47H reconnaissance plane was shot down by the Soviet Air Defence Forces while performing signals intelligence in the Barents Sea, near the Kola Peninsula, off the Arctic coast of the Soviet Union. Four of the six crew members died. The shootdown occurred exactly two months after the far better known U-2 shootdown involving Francis Gary Powers, and added to the tensions created by that incident.

The plane was part of the 55th Strategic Reconnaissance Wing and took off from RAF Brize Norton airbase in the UK. It was shot down by Soviet pilot Vasily Polyakov in a MiG-19. The US position was that the plane was in international waters, and this was later corroborated by information provided by spy Oleg Penkovsky.

Three of the crewmen (reconnaissance officers Capt. Oscar Goforth, Capt. Dean Phillips, and Capt. Eugene Posa) were missing in action, and the remains of one other (aircraft commander Maj. Willard Palm) were recovered. The two survivors, navigator Captain John R. McKone and co-pilot Captain Freeman "Bruce" Olmstead, were picked up by Soviet fishing trawlers and held in Lubyanka prison in Moscow until immediately after the inauguration of newly-elected US president Kennedy, when they were released by Soviet leader Nikita Khrushchev as a goodwill gesture.

McKone and Olmstead appeared on the cover of the 3 February 1961 issue of Time magazine. In his news conference on 21 April 1961, President Kennedy was asked if the dropping of charges against an accused Soviet spy was in exchange for the release of the RB-47 aviators. The president denied this.

As a result of their involvement in the incident, Olmstead and McKone received POW medals in 1996 and Silver Star medals in 2004, as well as the Distinguished Flying Cross.

See also

 United States aerial reconnaissance of the Soviet Union

General:
 Cold War (1953–1962)

Analogous incidents:
 1958 C-130 shootdown incident
 1960 U-2 incident
 Hainan Island incident

References

External links
 RB-47 Shootdown Information

1960 in international relations
1960 in military history
1960 in politics
RB-47 shootdown incident
20th-century aircraft shootdown incidents
Aviation accidents and incidents in the Soviet Union
Aviation accidents and incidents in 1960
Cold War conflicts
Combat incidents
Espionage scandals and incidents
Presidency of Dwight D. Eisenhower
Soviet Union–United States relations
July 1960 events in Europe
Espionage in the Soviet Union
Cold War military history of the Soviet Union